Association football (soccer) competitions at the 2015 Pan American Games in Toronto were held from July 11 to 26 at Tim Hortons Field (renamed Hamilton Pan Am Soccer Stadium due to sponsorship rules) in Hamilton. The men's tournament were an under-22 competition with a maximum of three over-age players allowed, while the women's tournament had no age restrictions. A total of eight teams competed in each respective tournament.

Competition schedule

The following was the competition schedule for the football competitions:

Medal table

Medalists

Qualification
A total of eight men's teams and eight women's teams qualified to compete at the games. Each team can consist of up to 18 athletes.

Men

Women

Participating nations
A total of twelve nations have qualified football teams. The numbers in parenthesis represents the number of participants entered.

Concerns
There was some concern that, as the event is in close proximity to the Women's World Cup and the men's Gold Cup that full-strength teams would not be fielded, particularly in the women's event which is not age-restricted, which in turn would affect quality of play. A spokesperson for the Canadian Soccer Association confirmed that younger players would make up the Canadian women's side. Six teams in the women's draw participated in the World Cup which finished six days prior to the start of the Pan Am tournament.

References

External links
Football - Schedule & Results, Toronto 2015 Official Website

 
Football
2015
2015 Pan American Games
2015 in Canadian soccer
2015 in South American football
2015–16 in CONCACAF football